Michal Janec (born 28 April 1992) is a Slovak football defender who currently plays for Dolný Kubín.

References

External links
 MFK Ružomberok profile
 Corgoň Liga profile
 

1992 births
Living people
Slovak footballers
Association football defenders
MŠK Žilina players
MŠK Rimavská Sobota players
MFK Tatran Liptovský Mikuláš players
FC Slovan Liberec players
MFK Ružomberok players
FK Fotbal Třinec players
FK Kolín players
MFK Lokomotíva Zvolen players
FK Iskra Borčice players
MFK Dolný Kubín players
Slovak Super Liga players
2. Liga (Slovakia) players
3. Liga (Slovakia) players
Czech National Football League players
Slovak expatriate sportspeople in the Czech Republic
Expatriate footballers in the Czech Republic